The 2012 Cincinnati Reds season was the 123rd season for the franchise in Major League Baseball, and their tenth at Great American Ball Park. The Reds improved on their record of 79–83 in 2011 and became the first team to clinch playoff berth in 2012 by defeating the Cubs 5–3 on September 20.  They clinched the NL Central division with a 6–0 victory over the Dodgers on September 22. Their final record was 97-65 and they subsequently lost in five games to the San Francisco Giants in the Division Series.

Standings

NL Central standings

NL Wild Card

Record vs. opponents

Regular Season Highlights
Opening Day Starting Lineup

April
 April 5: The Reds opened the season with a 4–0 shutout victory over the Miami Marlins in front of 42,956 fans — the largest crowd ever for a regular season game at Great American Ball Park. This was the first Opening Day shutout win for the Reds since 1980.

May
 May 13: Joey Votto homers three times, including a walk-off grand slam in a 9–6 win over the Washington Nationals on Mother's Day. Votto became the first player in Major League Baseball history to hit three homers and have one of them be a walk-off grand slam in the same game.
 May 21: In a 4-1 victory over the Atlanta Braves, The Reds had 4 solo home runs in one game, including three in a row in the 4th inning by Mike Leake, Zack Cozart and Drew Stubbs. Both Leake and Cozart's home runs were caught by the same fan, Caleb Lloyd. Mike Leake went 8 innings with 6 strikeouts to earn his first victory of 2012.
 May 21–24: The Reds complete a four-game sweep of the Atlanta Braves. The Reds hit 10 home runs during the series. It was the first 4-game sweep of the Braves since 1990. At the end of the series, the Reds ascended into first place by half a game when the Cardinals lost to the Phillies.

June
 June 12–14: The Reds sweep their in-state rivals, the Cleveland Indians, in three games. During the three wins, the Reds outscored the Indians 24–9 and outhit them 37–26.  
 June 15–17: The Reds win three straight games against the New York Mets for their second straight sweep, making 6 straight wins.
 June 18, 19, 20:  On June 18, 19, 20 the Indians swept their instate rival Cincinnati Reds in Cleveland scoring 21 runs to the Reds 12, beating LeCure, Chapman and Arroyo.

July
July 16: Joey Votto is placed on 15-day DL due to arthroscopic knee surgery.
July 19–29: The Reds beat Arizona in a dramatic comeback, then sweep Milwaukee at Great American Ball Park, Houston and Colorado on the road to go on a 10-game winning streak. All of these wins came without 2010 MVP and All-Star First Baseman, Joey Votto. As a result of the streak Hall of Fame announcer Marty Brennaman had his head shaved, with proceeds going to Cincinnati area charities.

August
 August 29: The Reds became the first team in MLB to reach 80 wins with a 6–2 win over the Arizona Diamondbacks. It was also the fastest the Reds have reached 80 wins since their 1976 season.

September
 September 20: The Reds became the first team in MLB to secure a spot in the playoffs with a 5–3 win over the Chicago Cubs.
 September 22: The Reds became the first division winner, with a 6-0 win over the Los Angeles Dodgers, the win gives the Reds their second NL Central title in three years.
 September 28: Homer Bailey no-hits the Pittsburgh Pirates at PNC Park. Only two men reached base, Barmes on a fielding error by Scott Rolen in the 3rd and a walk by McCutchen in the 7th. It was the 15th no-hitter in the long existence of the Cincinnati Reds. Frazier's sacrifice fly, scoring Phillips in the 1st was the lone run. Bailey struck out 10.

Game log

|- style="text-align:center; background:#bfb;"
| 1 || April 5 || Marlins || FSO || W 4–0 || Cueto (1–0) || Buehrle (0–1) || || 42,956 || 1–0 || 
|- style="text-align:center; background:#fbb;"
| 2 || April 7 || Marlins || FSO || L 3–8 || Nolasco (1–0) || Latos (0–1) || || 41,662 || 1–1 || 
|- style="text-align:center; background:#bfb;"
| 3 || April 8 || Marlins || FSO || W 6–5 || Chapman (1–0) || Bell (0–1) || || 23,539 || 2–1 || 
|- style="text-align:center; background:#fbb;"
| 4 || April 9 || Cardinals || FSO || L 1–7 || Westbrook (1–0) || Bailey (0–1) || || 16,909 || 2–2 || 
|- style="text-align:center; background:#fbb;"
| 5 || April 10 || Cardinals || FSO || L 1–3 || Lohse (2–0) || Leake (0–1) || Motte (2) || 17,110 || 2–3 || 
|- style="text-align:center; background:#bfb;"
| 6 || April 11 || Cardinals || MLBN || W 4–3 || Chapman (2–0) || Rzepczynski (0–1) || || 20,672 || 3–3 || 
|- style="text-align:center; background:#fbb;"
| 7 || April 12 || @ Nationals || FSO || L 2–3 (10) || Stammen (1–0) || Simón (0–1) || || 40,907 || 3–4 || 
|- style="text-align:center; background:#fbb;"
| 8 || April 13 || @ Nationals || FSO || L 1–2 (13) || Stammen (2–0) || Marshall (0–1) || || 26,959 || 3–5 || 
|- style="text-align:center; background:#fbb;"
| 9 || April 14 || @ Nationals || FSO || L 1–4 || Jackson (1–0) || Bailey (0–2) || || 35,489 || 3–6 || 
|- style="text-align:center; background:#bfb;"
| 10 || April 15 || @ Nationals || FSO || W 8–5 (11) || Arredondo (1–0) || Clippard (1–1) || Marshall (1) || 25,679 || 4–6 || 
|- style="text-align:center; background:#fbb;"
| 11 || April 17 || @ Cardinals || FSO || L 1–2 (10) || Motte (1–0) || LeCure (0–1) || || 35,562 || 4–7 || 
|- style="text-align:center; background:#fbb;"
| 12 || April 18 || @ Cardinals || FSO || L 1–11 || Garcia (2–0) || Latos (0–2) || || 35,907 || 4–8 || 
|- style="text-align:center; background:#bfb;"
| 13 || April 19 || @ Cardinals || FSO || W 6–3 || Arroyo (1–0) || Wainwright (0–3) || Marshall (2) || 40,049 || 5–8 || 
|- style="text-align:center; background:#bfb;"
| 14 || April 20 || @ Cubs || FSO || W 9–4 || Bailey (1–2) || Volstad (0–2) || || 37,782 || 6–8 || 
|- style="text-align:center; background:#fbb;"
| 15 || April 21 || @ Cubs || FSO || L 1–6 || Maholm (1–2) || Leake (0–2) || || 38,405 || 6–9 || 
|- style="text-align:center; background:#bfb;"
| 16 || April 22 || @ Cubs || FSO || W 4–3 || Cueto (2–0) || López (0–1) || Marshall (3) || 35,801 || 7–9 || 
|- style="text-align:center; background:#bfb;"
| 17 || April 24 || Giants || FSO || W 9–2 || Latos (1–2) || Cain (1–1) || || 19,051 || 8–9 || 
|- style="text-align:center; background:#bfb;"
| 18 || April 25 || Giants || FSO || W 4–2 || Arredondo (2–0) || Hensley (1–2) || Marshall (4) || 17,115 || 9–9 || 
|- style="text-align:center; background:#fbb;"
| 19 || April 26 || Giants || FSO || L 5–6 || López (2–0) || Marshall (0–2) || Casilla (2) || 17,317 || 9–10 || 
|- style="text-align:center; background:#fbb;"
| 20 || April 27 || Astros || FSO || L 4–6 || Rodríguez (2–2) || Leake (0–3) || Myers (4) || 29,486 || 9–11 || 
|- style="text-align:center; background:#bfb;"
| 21 || April 28 || Astros || FSO || W 6–0 || Cueto (3–0) || Harrell (1–2) || || 32,971 || 10–11 || 
|- style="text-align:center; background:#bfb;"
| 22 || April 29 || Astros || FSO || W 6–5 || Ondrusek (1–0) || Rodriguez (0–3) || Marshall (5) || 31,086 || 11–11 || 
|-

|- style="text-align:center; background:#bbb;"
| – || May 1 || Cubs || FSO ||colspan=7| Postponed (rain). Makeup Date August 18. 
|- style="text-align:center; background:#fbb;"
| 23 || May 2 || Cubs || FSO || L 1–3 || Samardzija (3–1) || Arroyo (1–1) || Mármol (2) || 16,868 || 11–12 || 
|- style="text-align:center; background:#bfb;"
| 24 || May 3 || Cubs || || W 4–3 (10) || Ondrusek (2–0) || Dolis (1–2) || || 23,288 || 12–12 || 
|- style="text-align:center; background:#bfb;"
| 25 || May 4 || @ Pirates || FSO || W 6–1 || Cueto (4–0) || Correia (1–2) || || 20,445 || 13–12 || 
|- style="text-align:center; background:#fbb;"
| 26 || May 5 || @ Pirates || FSO || L 2–3 || McDonald (2–1) || Leake (0–4) || Hanrahan (5) || 33,019 || 13–13 || 
|- style="text-align:center; background:#bfb;"
| 27 || May 6 || @ Pirates || FSO || W 5–0 || Latos (2–2) || Morton (1–3) || || 20,042 || 14–13 || 
|- style="text-align:center; background:#bfb;"
| 28 || May 7 || @ Brewers || FSO || W 6–1 || Arroyo (2–1) || Estrada (0–2) || || 27,157 || 15–13 || 
|- style="text-align:center; background:#fbb;"
| 29 || May 8 || @ Brewers || FSO || L 3–8 || Gallardo (2–3) || Bailey (1–3) || || 28,108 || 15–14 || 
|- style="text-align:center; background:#bfb;"
| 30 || May 9 || @ Brewers || FSO || W 2–1 || Chapman (3–0) || Axford (0–2) || Ondrusek (1) || 27,090 || 16–14 || 
|- style="text-align:center; background:#fbb;"
| 31 || May 11 || Nationals || FSO || L 3–7 || Gonzalez (4–1) || Leake (0–5) || || 37,255 || 16–15 || 
|- style="text-align:center; background:#fbb;"
| 32 || May 12 || Nationals || FSO || L 1–2 || Zimmermann (2–3) || Arredondo (2–1) || Rodríguez (8) || 42,294 || 16–16 || 
|- style="text-align:center; background:#bfb;"
| 33 || May 13 || Nationals || FSO || W 9–6 || Marshall (1–2) || Rodríguez (1-3) || || 28,361 || 17–16 || 
|- style="text-align:center; background:#bfb;"
| 34 || May 14 || @ Braves || FSO || W 3–1 || Ondrusek (3–0) || Venters (2-2) || Marshall (6) || 19,697 || 18–16 || 
|- style="text-align:center; background:#fbb;"
| 35 || May 15 || @ Braves || FSO || L 2–6 || Hudson (2–1) || Cueto (4–1) || || 21,530 || 18–17 || 
|- style="text-align:center; background:#bfb;"
| 36 || May 16 || @ Mets || FSO || W 6–3 || Arredondo (3–1) || Rauch (3–2) || Marshall (7) || 22,659 || 19–17 || 
|- style="text-align:center; background:#fbb;"
| 37 || May 17 || @ Mets || FSO || L 4–9 || Parnell (1–0) || Ondrusek (3–1) || || 29,943 || 19–18 || 
|- style="text-align:center; background:#fbb;"
| 38 || May 18 || @ Yankees || FSO || L 0–4 || Pettitte (1–1) || Arroyo (2–2) || || 42,015 || 19–19 || 
|- style="text-align:center; background:#bfb;"
| 39 || May 19 || @ Yankees || FSO || W 6–5 || Bailey (2–3) || Nova (4–2) || Arredondo (1) || 45,302 || 20–19 || 
|- style="text-align:center; background:#bfb;"
| 40 || May 20 || @ Yankees || FSO || W 5–2 || Cueto (5–1) || Sabathia (5–2) || Chapman (1) || 45,622 || 21–19 || 
|- style="text-align:center; background:#bfb;"
| 41 || May 21 || Braves || FSO || W 4–1 || Leake (1–5) || Minor (2–4) || Marshall (8) || 17,606 || 22–19 || 
|- style="text-align:center; background:#bfb;"
| 42 || May 22 || Braves || FSO || W 4–3 || Latos (3–2) || Beachy (5–2) || Chapman (2) || 26,438 || 23–19 || 
|- style="text-align:center; background:#bfb;"
| 43 || May 23 || Braves || FSO || W 2–1 || Chapman (4–0) || Martínez (2–1) || || 20,411 || 24–19 || 
|- style="text-align:center; background:#bfb;"
| 44 || May 24 || Braves || FSO || W 6–3 || Bailey (3–3) || Delgado (2–5) || Ondrusek (2) || 23,312 || 25–19 || 
|- style="text-align:center; background:#fbb;"
| 45 || May 25 || Rockies || FSO || L 3–6 || Friedrich (2–1) || Cueto (5–2) || Betancourt (8) || 29,597 || 25–20 || 
|- style="text-align:center; background:#bfb;"
| 46 || May 26 || Rockies || Fox || W 10–3 || Hoover (1–0) || Guthrie (2–3) || || 35,314 || 26–20 || 
|- style="text-align:center; background:#bfb;"
| 47 || May 27 || Rockies || FSO || W 7–5 || Latos (4–2) || Moyer (2–5) || Chapman (3) || 29,368 || 27–20 || 
|- style="text-align:center; background:#fbb;"
| 48 || May 28 || @ Pirates || FSO || L 1–4 || McDonald (4–2) || Arroyo (2–3) || Hanrahan (12) || 14,792 || 27–21 || 
|- style="text-align:center; background:#bfb;"
| 49 || May 29 || @ Pirates || FSO || W 8–1 || Bailey (4–3) || Morton (2–6) || || 12,077 || 28–21 || 
|- style="text-align:center; background:#fbb;"
| 50 || May 30 || @ Pirates || FSO || L 1–2 || Burnett (4–2) || Cueto (5–3) || Hanrahan (13) || 16,782 || 28–22 || 
|-

|- style="text-align:center; background:#bfb;"
| 51 || June 1 || @ Astros || FSO || W 4–1 || Leake (2–5) || Happ (4–5) || Chapman (4) || 21,464 || 29–22 || 
|- style="text-align:center; background:#bfb;"
| 52 || June 2 || @ Astros || Fox || W 12–9 || LeCure (1–1) || Rodriguez (1–6) || Chapman (5) || 22,991 || 30–22 || 
|- style="text-align:center; background:#fbb;"
| 53 || June 3 || @ Astros || FSO || L 3–5 || Lyles (1–1) || Arroyo (2–4) || Myers (13) || 19,914 || 30–23 || 
|- style="text-align:center; background:#fbb;"
| 54 || June 5 || Pirates || FSO || L 4–8 || Burnett (5–2) || Bailey (4–4) || Hanrahan (15) || 19,906 || 30–24 || 
|- style="text-align:center; background:#bfb;"
| 55 || June 6 || Pirates || FSO || W 5–4 || Cueto (6–3) || Lincoln (3–1) || Chapman (6) || 16,859 || 31–24 || 
|- style="text-align:center; background:#fbb;"
| 56 || June 7 || Pirates || FSO || L 4–5 (10) || Hanrahan (3–0) || Chapman (4–1) || Resop (1) || 23,106 || 31–25 || 
|- style="text-align:center; background:#bfb;"
| 57 || June 8 || Tigers || FSO || W 6–5 (10) || LeCure (2–1) || Coke (1–2) || || 38,653 || 32–25 || 
|- style="text-align:center; background:#fbb;"
| 58 || June 9 || Tigers || FSO || L 2–3 || Villarreal (2–1) || Marshall (1–3) || Valverde (11) || 42,443 || 32–26 || 
|- style="text-align:center; background:#fbb;"
| 59 || June 10 || Tigers || ESPN || L 6–7 || Villarreal (3–1) || Chapman (4–2) || Valverde (12) || 34,056 || 32–27 || 
|- style="text-align:center; background:#bfb;"
| 60 || June 12 || Indians || FSO || W 7–1 || Cueto (7–3) || Gómez (4–5) || || 27,758 || 33–27 || 
|- style="text-align:center; background:#bfb;"
| 61 || June 13 || Indians || FSO || W 5–3 || Latos (5–2) || Lowe (7–5) || Chapman (7) || 27,428 || 34–27 || 
|- style="text-align:center; background:#bfb;"
| 62 || June 14 || Indians || FSO || W 12–5 || Arredondo (4–1) || Tomlin (3–4) || || 34,193 || 35–27 || 
|- style="text-align:center; background:#bfb;"
| 63 || June 15 || @ Mets || FSO || W 7–3 || Arroyo (3–4) || Gee (4–5) || || 34,716 || 36–27 || 
|- style="text-align:center; background:#bfb;"
| 64 || June 16 || @ Mets || Fox || W 4–1 || Bailey (5–4) || Niese (4–3) || Chapman (8) || 27,988 || 37–27 || 
|- style="text-align:center; background:#bfb;"
| 65 || June 17 || @ Mets || FSO || W 3–1 || Cueto (8–3) || Young (1–1) || Marshall (9) || 40,134 || 38–27 || 
|- style="text-align:center; background:#fbb;"
| 66 || June 18 || @ Indians || FSO || L 9–10 || Smith (5–1) || LeCure (2–2) || Perez (22) || 19,948 || 38–28 || 
|- style="text-align:center; background:#fbb;"
| 67 || June 19 || @ Indians || FSO || L 2–3 (10) || Hagadone (1–0) || Chapman (4–3) || || 17,213 || 38–29 || 
|- style="text-align:center; background:#fbb;"
| 68 || June 20 || @ Indians || FSO || L 1–8 || Masterson (4–6) || Arroyo (3–5) || || 23,544 || 38–30 || 
|- style="text-align:center; background:#fbb;"
| 69 || June 22 || Twins || FSO || L 4–5 || Blackburn (4–4) || Bailey (5–5) || Perkins (2) || 33,531 || 38–31 || 
|- style="text-align:center; background:#bfb;"
| 70 || June 23 || Twins || FSO || W 6–0 || Cueto (9–3) || Duensing (1–3) || || 41,750 || 39–31 || 
|- style="text-align:center; background:#fbb;"
| 71 || June 24 || Twins || FSO || L 3–4 || Diamond (6–3) || Chapman (4–4) || Burton (1) || 34,513 || 39–32 || 
|- style="text-align:center; background:#bfb;"
| 72 || June 25 || Brewers || FSO || W 3–1 || Latos (6–2) || Gallardo (6–6) || || 34,485 || 40–32 || 
|- style="text-align:center; background:#bfb;"
| 73 || June 26 || Brewers || FSO || W 4–3 || Marshall (2–3) || Axford (1–5) || Chapman (9) || 32,986 || 41–32 || 
|- style="text-align:center; background:#fbb;"
| 74 || June 27 || Brewers || FSO || L 4–8 || Greinke (9–2) || Bailey (5–6) || || 28,906 || 41–33 || 
|- style="text-align:center; background:#fbb;"
| 75 || June 28 || @ Giants || FSO || L 0–5 || Bumgarner (10–4) || Cueto (9–4) || || 41,626 || 41–34 || 
|- style="text-align:center; background:#bfb;"
| 76 || June 29 || @ Giants || FSO || W 5–1 || Leake (3–5) || Cain (9–3) || || 41,960 || 42–34 || 
|- style="text-align:center; background:#bfb;"
| 77 || June 30 || @ Giants || FSO || W 2–1 || Latos (7–2) || Zito (6–6) || || 42,135 || 43–34 || 
|-

|- style="text-align:center; background:#fbb;"
| 78 || July 1 || @ Giants || FSO || L 3–4 || Casilla (2–3) || Arredondo (4–2) || || 42,039 || 43–35 || 
|- style="text-align:center; background:#bfb;"
| 79 || July 2 || @ Dodgers || FSO || W 8–2 || Bailey (6–6) || Billingsley (4–8) || || 34,493 || 44–35 || 
|- style="text-align:center; background:#fbb;"
| 80 || July 3 || @ Dodgers || FSO || L 1–3 || Elbert (1–1) || Cueto (9–5) || Jansen (13) || 33,884 || 44–36 || 
|- style="text-align:center; background:#fbb;"
| 81 || July 4 || @ Dodgers || FSO || L 1–4 || Harang (6–5) || Leake (3–6) || Jansen (14) || 53,570 || 44–37 || 
|- style="text-align:center; background:#fbb;"
| 82 || July 5 || @ Padres || FSO || L 1–2 || Street (2–0) || Ondrusek (3–2) || || 25,181 || 44–38 || 
|- style="text-align:center; background:#bfb;"
| 83 || July 6 || @ Padres || FSO || W 6–0 || Arroyo (4–5) || Wells (1–2) || || 26,016 || 45–38 || 
|- style="text-align:center; background:#bfb;"
| 84 || July 7 || @ Padres || FSO || W 6–5 || Bailey (7–6) || Richard (6–9) || Chapman (10) || 34,222 || 46–38 || 
|- style="text-align:center; background:#bfb;"
| 85 || July 8 || @ Padres || FSO || W 4–2 || Cueto (10–5) || Marquis (3–9) || Chapman (11) || 24,032 || 47–38 || 
|- style="text-align:center;"
| colspan="11" style="background:#bbcaff;"|July 10: 2012 MLB All-Star Game – Kansas City, Missouri at Kauffman Stadium 
|- style="text-align:center; background:#bfb;"
| 86 || July 13 || Cardinals || FSO || W 5–3 || Simón (1–1) || Wainwright (7–9) || Chapman (12) || 40,217 || 48–38 || 
|- style="text-align:center; background:#bfb;"
| 87 || July 14 || Cardinals || Fox || W 3–2 (10) || LeCure (3–2) || Marte (2–2) || || 37,583 || 49–38 || 
|- style="text-align:center; background:#bfb;"
| 88 || July 15 || Cardinals || ESPN || W 4–2 || Bailey (8–6) || Westbrook (7–8) || Chapman (13) || 39,280 || 50–38 || 
|- style="text-align:center; background:#fbb;"
| 89 || July 16 || Diamondbacks || FSO || L 3–5 || Miley (10–5) || Arroyo (4–6) || Putz (17) || 27,735 || 50–39 || 
|- style="text-align:center; background:#bfb;"
| 90 || July 17 || Diamondbacks || FSO || W 4–0 || Cueto (11–5) || Bauer (1–2) || Chapman (14) || 19,142 || 51–39 || 
|- style="text-align:center; background:#fbb;"
| 91 || July 18 || Diamondbacks || FSO || L 1–7 || Kennedy (7–8) || Latos (7–3) || || 26,077 || 51–40 || 
|- style="text-align:center; background:#bfb;"
| 92 || July 19 || Diamondbacks || || W 7–6 || Simón (2–1) || Shaw (1–4) || Chapman (15) || 21,620 || 52–40 || 
|- style="text-align:center; background:#bfb;"
| 93 || July 20 || Brewers || FSO || W 3–1 || Bailey (9–6) || Estrada (0–4) || Chapman (16) || 30,247 || 53–40 || 
|- style="text-align:center; background:#bfb;"
| 94 || July 21 || Brewers || FSO || W 6–2 || Arroyo (5–6) || Gallardo (8–7) || || 40,090 || 54–40 || 
|- style="text-align:center; background:#bfb;"
| 95 || July 22 || Brewers || FSO || W 2–1 || Cueto (12–5) || Fiers (3–4) || Chapman (17) || 32,884 || 55–40 || 
|- style="text-align:center; background:#bfb;"
| 96 || July 23|| @ Astros || FSO || W 8–3 || Latos (8–3) || Rodríguez (7–9) || || 15,538 || 56–40 || 
|- style="text-align:center; background:#bfb;"
| 97 || July 24 || @ Astros || FSO || W 4–2 || Leake (4–6) || Cordero (3–6) || Chapman (18) || 15,908 || 57–40 || 
|- style="text-align:center; background:#bfb;"
| 98 || July 25 || @ Astros || FSO || W 5–3 || Marshall (3–3) || Cordero (3–7) || Chapman (19) || 16,077 || 58–40 || 
|- style="text-align:center; background:#bfb;"
| 99 || July 27 || @ Rockies || FSO || W 3–0 || Arroyo (6–6) || Pomeranz (1–6) || Chapman (20) || 38,214 || 59–40 || 
|- style="text-align:center; background:#bfb;"
| 100 || July 28 || @ Rockies || FSO || W 9–7 || Cueto (13–5) || Friedrich (5–8) || Chapman (21) || 42,826 || 60–40 || 
|- style="text-align:center; background:#bfb;"
| 101 || July 29 || @ Rockies || FSO || W 7–2 || Latos (9–3) || Sánchez (1–8) || || 29,340 || 61–40 || 
|- style="text-align:center; background:#fbb;"
| 102 || July 30 || Padres || FSO || L 5–11 || Vólquez (7–7) || Leake (4–7) || || 28,140 || 61–41 || 
|- style="text-align:center; background:#bfb;"
| 103 || July 31 || Padres || FSO || W 7–6 || Marshall (4–3) || Marquis (6–10) || Chapman (22) || 20,356 || 62–41 || 
|-

|- style="text-align:center; background:#bfb;"
| 104 || August 1 || Padres || FSO || W 6–4 || Arroyo (7–6) || Wells (2–4) || Chapman (23) || 20,527 || 63–41 || 
|- style="text-align:center; background:#bfb;"
| 105 || August 2 || Padres || || W 9–4 || Cueto (14–5) || Ohlendorf (3–2) || || 22,396 || 64–41 || 
|- style="text-align:center; background:#bfb;"
| 106 || August 3 || Pirates || FSO || W 3–0 || Latos (10–3) || Rodríguez (7–10) || Chapman (24) || 40,829 || 65–41 || 
|- style="text-align:center; background:#bfb;"
| 107 || August 4 || Pirates || FSO || W 5–4 || Broxton (2–2) || Hughes (2–1) || Chapman (25) || 41,577 || 66–41 || 
|- style="text-align:center; background:#fbb;"
| 108 || August 5 || Pirates || FSO || L 2–6 || Burnett (14–3) || Bailey (9–7) || Hanrahan (32) || 38,624 || 66–42 || 
|- style="text-align:center; background:#fbb;"
| 109 || August 6 || @ Brewers || FSO || L 3–6 || Gallardo (10–8) || Arroyo (7–7) || Axford (18) || 31,319 || 66–43 || 
|- style="text-align:center; background:#fbb;"
| 110 || August 7 || @ Brewers || FSO || L 1–3 || Fiers (6–4) || Cueto (14–6) || Henderson (1) || 41,213 || 66–44 || 
|- style="text-align:center; background:#fbb;"
| 111 || August 8 || @ Brewers || FSO || L 2–3 || Axford (4–6) || Broxton (2–3) || Henderson (2) || 33,788 || 66–45 || 
|- style="text-align:center; background:#fbb;"
| 112 || August 9 || @ Cubs || FSO || L 3–5 || Camp (3–5) || Marshall (4–4) || Mármol (14) || 33,397 || 66–46 || 
|- style="text-align:center; background:#bfb;"
| 113 || August 10 || @ Cubs || || W 10–8 || Bailey (10–7) || Germano (1–2) || Chapman (26) || 36,891 || 67–46 || 
|- style="text-align:center; background:#bfb;"
| 114 || August 11 || @ Cubs || FSO || W 4–2 || Arroyo (8–7) || Russell (5–1) || Chapman (27) || 40,602 || 68–46 || 
|- style="text-align:center; background:#bfb;"
| 115 || August 12 || @ Cubs || FSO || W 3–0 || Cueto (15–6) || Raley (0–2) || Chapman (28) || 35,461 || 69–46 || 
|- style="text-align:center; background:#bfb;"
| 116 || August 14 || Mets || FSO || W 3–0 || Arredondo (5–2) || Acosta (1–3) || || 26,113 || 70–46 || 
|- style="text-align:center; background:#bfb;"
| 117 || August 15 || Mets || FSO || W 6–1 || Leake (5–7) || Dickey (15–4) || || 26,082 || 71–46 || 
|- style="text-align:center; background:#fbb;"
| 118 || August 16 || Mets || FSO || L 4–8 || Harvey (2–3) || Bailey (10–8) || Rauch (3) || 23,137 || 71–47 || 
|- style="text-align:center; background:#bfb;"
| 119 || August 17 || Cubs || FSO || W 7–3 || Arroyo (9–7) || Wood (4–9) || || 35,332 || 72–47 || 
|- style="text-align:center; background:#bfb;"
| 120 || August 18 || Cubs || FSO || W 5–3 || Cueto (16–6) || Samardzija (8–11) || Chapman (29) || 28,754 || 73–47 || 
|- style="text-align:center; background:#fbb;"
| 121 || August 18 || Cubs || FSO || L 7–9 || Raley (1–2) || Redmond (0–1) || Mármol (15) || 41,236 || 73–48 || 
|- style="text-align:center; background:#bfb;"
| 122 || August 19 || Cubs || FSO || W 5–4 || Chapman (5–4) || Camp (3–6) || || 41,615 || 74–48 || 
|- style="text-align:center; background:#fbb;"
| 123 || August 20 || @ Phillies || FSO || L 5–12 || Halladay (7–7) || Leake (5–8) || || 44,341 || 74–49 || 
|- style="text-align:center; background:#bfb;"
| 124 || August 21 || @ Phillies || FSO || W 5–4 || Broxton (3–3) || Papelbon (3–5) || Chapman (30) || 45,091 || 75–49 || 
|- style="text-align:center; background:#bfb;"
| 125 || August 22 || @ Phillies || FSO || W 3–2 || Arroyo (10–7) || Worley (6–9) || Chapman (31) || 41,794 || 76–49 || 
|- style="text-align:center; background:#fbb;"
| 126 || August 23 || @ Phillies || FSO || L 3–4 (11) || Valdés (3–2) || Simón (2–2) || || 41,972 || 76–50 || 
|- style="text-align:center; background:#fbb;"
| 127 || August 24 || Cardinals || FSO || L 5–8 || Kelly (4–5) || Latos (10–4) || Motte (30) || 36,162 || 76–51 || 
|- style="text-align:center; background:#bfb;"
| 128 || August 25 || Cardinals || Fox || W 8–2 || Leake (6–8) || García (3–5) || || 41,680 || 77–51 || 
|- style="text-align:center; background:#fbb;"
| 129 || August 26 || Cardinals || FSO || L 2–8 || Wainwright (13–10) || Bailey (10–9) || || 31,564 || 77–52 || 
|- style="text-align:center; background:#bfb;"
| 130 || August 27 || @ Diamondbacks || FSO || W 4–3 || Arroyo (11–7) || Skaggs (1–1) || Chapman (32) || 17,966 || 78–52 || 
|- style="text-align:center; background:#bfb;"
| 131 || August 28 || @ Diamondbacks || FSO || W 5–2 || Cueto (17–6) || Miley (14–9) || Chapman (33) || 20,550 || 79–52 || 
|- style="text-align:center; background:#bfb;"
| 132 || August 29 || @ Diamondbacks || || W 6–2 || Latos (11–4) || Corbin (14–9) || || 18,451 || 80–52 || 
|- style="text-align:center; background:#bfb;"
| 133 || August 31 || @ Astros || FSO || W 9–3 || Leake (7–8) || Abad (0–2) || || 15,287 || 81–52 || 
|-

|- style="text-align:center; background:#fbb;"
| 134 || September 1 || @ Astros || FSO || L 1–2 || López (6–3) || Marshall (4–5) || || 18,316 || 81–53 || 
|- style="text-align:center; background:#bfb;"
| 135 || September 2 || @ Astros || FSO || W 5–3 || Arredondo (6–2) || Cedeño (0–1) || Chapman (34) || 17,291 || 82–53 || 
|- style="text-align:center; background:#fbb;"
| 136 || September 3 || Phillies || FSO || L 2–4 || Cloyd (1–1) || Cueto (17–7) || Aumont (1) || 22,487 || 82–54 || 
|- style="text-align:center; background:#bfb;"
| 137 || September 4 || Phillies || FSO || W 2–1 || Latos (12–4) || Kendrick (8–10) || Chapman (35) || 17,806 || 83–54 || 
|- style="text-align:center; background:#fbb;"
| 138 || September 5 || Phillies || FSO || L 2–6 || Halladay (9–7) || Leake (7–9) || || 19,267 || 83–55 || 
|- style="text-align:center; background:#fbb;"
| 139 || September 7 || Astros || FSO || L 3–5 || Ambriz (1–0) || Chapman (5–5) || López (3) || 23,785 || 83–56 || 
|- style="text-align:center; background:#bfb;"
| 140 || September 8 || Astros || FSO || W 5–1 || Arroyo (12–7) || Norris (5–12) || || 35,018 || 84–56 || 
|- style="text-align:center; background:#fbb;"
| 141 || September 9 || Astros || FSO || L 1–5 || González (2–0) || Cueto (17–8) || || 33,438 || 84–57 || 
|- style="text-align:center; background:#bfb;"
| 142 || September 10 || Pirates || FSO || W 4–3 (14) || Simón (3–2) || VandenHurk (0–1) || || 16,577 || 85–57 || 
|- style="text-align:center; background:#bfb;"
| 143 || September 11 || Pirates || FSO || W 5–3 || Leake (8–9) || Correia (10–9) || Broxton (24) || 19,620 || 86–57 || 
|- style="text-align:center; background:#bfb;"
| 144 || September 12 || Pirates || FSO || W 2–1 || Bailey (11–9) || Burnett (15–7) || Hoover (1) || 21,203 || 87–57 || 
|- style="text-align:center; background:#fbb;"
| 145 || September 14 || @ Marlins || FSO || L 0–4 || Turner (2–3) || Arroyo (12–8) || || 27,111 || 87–58 || 
|- style="text-align:center; background:#fbb;"
| 146 || September 15 || @ Marlins || FSO || L 4–6 || Buehrle (13–12) || Cueto (17–9) || Cishek (14) || 27,502 || 87–59 || 
|- style="text-align:center; background:#bfb;"
| 147 || September 16 || @ Marlins || FSO || W 5–4 (11) || Ondrusek (4–2) || Zambrano (7–10) || Broxton (25) || 24,983 || 88–59 || 
|- style="text-align:center; background:#bfb;"
| 148 || September 18 || @ Cubs || FSO || W 3–1 || Bailey (12–9) || Germano (2–8) || Broxton (26) || 32,547 || 89–59 || 
|- style="text-align:center; background:#bfb;"
| 149 || September 19 || @ Cubs || FSO || W 6–5 (11) || Ondrusek (5–2) || Cabrera (7–10) || Broxton (27) || 31,001 || 90–59 || 
|- style="text-align:center; background:#bfb;"
| 150 || September 20 || @ Cubs || FSO || W 5–3 || Cueto (18–9) || Corpas (0–2) || Simón (1) || 25,891 || 91–59 || 
|- style="text-align:center; background:#fbb;"
| 151 || September 21 || Dodgers || FSO || L 1–3 (10) || Belisario (8–1) || LeCure (3–3) || League (13) || 35,397 || 91–60 || 
|- style="text-align:center; background:#bfb;"
| 152 || September 22 || Dodgers || Fox || W 6–0 || Latos (13–4) || Fife (0–2) || || 41,117 || 92–60 || 
|- style="text-align:center; background:#fbb;"
| 153 || September 23 || Dodgers || ESPN || L 3–5 || Tolleson (3–1) || Bailey (12–10) || League (14) || 32,932 || 92–61 || 
|- style="text-align:center; background:#bfb;"
| 154 || September 25 || Brewers || FSO || W 4–2 || Cueto (19–9) || Fiers (9–9) || Chapman (36) || 18,155 || 93–61 || 
|- style="text-align:center; background:#fbb;"
| 155 || September 26 || Brewers || FSO || L 1–8 || Marcum (6–4) || Arroyo (12–9) || || 20,570 || 93–62 || 
|- style="text-align:center; background:#bfb;"
| 156 || September 27 || Brewers || FSO || W 2–1 || Broxton (4–3) || Axford (5–8) || || 23,411 || 94–62 || 
|- style="text-align:center; background:#bfb;"
| 157 || September 28 || @ Pirates || FSO || W 1–0 || Bailey (13–10) || Burnett (16–9) || || 34,796 || 95–62 || 
|- style="text-align:center; background:#fbb;"
| 158 || September 29 || @ Pirates || FSO || L 1–2 || Hanrahan (5–1) || Broxton (4–4) || || 38,623 || 95–63 || 
|- style="text-align:center; background:#bfb;"
| 159 || September 30 || @ Pirates || FSO || W 4–3 || Marshall (5–5) || Hanrahan (5–2) || Chapman (37) || 32,814 || 96–63 || 
|-

|- style="text-align:center; background:#fbb;"
| 160 || October 1|| @ Cardinals || FSO || L 2–4 || García (7–7) || Arroyo (12–10) || Motte (41) || 38,480 || 96–64 || 
|- style="text-align:center; background:#bfb;"
| 161 || October 2|| @ Cardinals || FSO || W 3–1 || Latos (14–4) || Carpenter (0–2) || Chapman (38) || 39,644 || 97–64 || 
|- style="text-align:center; background:#fbb;"
| 162 || October 3|| @ Cardinals || FSO || L 0–1 || Marté (3–2) || Broxton (4–5) || Motte (42) || 42,509 || 97–65 || 
|-

Postseason

Game log

|-  bgcolor="ffbbbb"
|- align="center" bgcolor="bbffbb"
| 1 || October 6 || @ Giants (TBS) || W 5–2 || LeCure (1–0) || Cain (0–1) ||  || 43,492 || CIN 1–0
|- align="center" bgcolor="bbffbb"
| 2 || October 7 || @ Giants (TBS) || W 9–0 || Arroyo (1–0) ||Bumgarner (0-1)  ||  || 43,505 || CIN 2–0
|- align="center" bgcolor="ffbbbb"
| 3 || October 9 || Giants (TBS) || L 1–2 || Romo (1–0) || Broxton (0-1) ||  || 44,501 || CIN 2–1
|- align="center" bgcolor="ffbbbb"
| 4 || October 10 || Giants (TBS) || L 3–8 || Lincecum (1–0) || Leake (0-1) ||  || 44,375 || Tied 2–2
|- align="center" bgcolor="ffbbbb"
| 5 || October 11 || Giants (TBS) || L 4–6 || Cain (1–1) || Latos (0-1) || Romo (1) || 44,142 || SF 3–2
|-

Series Notes

National League Division Series: vs. San Francisco Giants

Game 1
Saturday, October 6, 2012 – 9:37 pm (ET) at AT&T Park in San Francisco, California

Game 2
Sunday, October 7, 2012 – 9:37 pm (ET) at AT&T Park in San Francisco, California

Game 3
Tuesday, October 9, 2012 – 5:37 pm (ET) at Great American Ball Park in Cincinnati

Game 4
Wednesday, October 10, 2012 – 4:07 pm (ET) at Great American Ball Park in Cincinnati

Game 5
Thursday, October 11, 2012 – 1:07 pm (ET) at Great American Ball Park in Cincinnati

Roster

Player statistics
Up to date .

Batting

Note: G = Games played; AB = At bats; R = Runs scored; H = Hits; 2B = Doubles; 3B = Triples; HR = Home runs; RBI = Runs batted in; SB = Stolen bases; AVG = Batting average

Full batting stats can be found here:

Pitching
Note: G = Games pitched; GS = Games started; IP = Innings pitched; W = Wins; L = Losses; SV = Saves; HLD = Holds; ERA = Earned run average; SO = Strikeouts; WHIP = Walks and hits per inning pitched

Full pitching stats can be found here:

Farm System

Minor league standings
''Standings as of: September 11, 2012

References

External links
 2012 Cincinnati Reds at Baseball Reference
 Official Website

Cincinnati Reds seasons
Cincinnati Reds
National League Central champion seasons
Cincinnati Reds